Leptophlebia vespertina is a species of pronggill mayfly in the family Leptophlebiidae. It is found in Europe.

References

Leptophlebiidae
Insects of Europe
Insects described in 1758
Taxa named by Carl Linnaeus
Articles created by Qbugbot